Harand County is in Isfahan province, Iran. The capital of the county is the city of Harand. At the 2006 census, the county's population (as Jolgeh District of Isfahan County) was 19,527 in 5,313 households. The following census in 2011 counted 20,547 people in 6,245 households. At the 2016 census, the district's population was 21,257 in 6,871 households. The district was separated from Isfahan County in 2021 to become Harand County.

Administrative divisions

The population history of Harand County's administrative divisions (as Jolgeh District of Isfahan County) over three consecutive censuses is shown in the following table.

References

Counties of Isfahan Province

fa:شهرستان هرند